Iwur or Morop is one of the Ok languages of West Papua.
Komanarepket may be a distinct language.

References

Languages of western New Guinea
Ok languages